The Municipality of Juršinci is a municipality in the traditional region of Styria in northeastern Slovenia. The seat of the municipality is the town of Juršinci. Juršinci became a municipality in 1994.

The municipality has a population of 2,361. The majority are farmers. Agriculture in the area focuses mainly on viticulture and fruit production. Ludvik Toplak, a lawyer, university chancellor, ambassador, politician, and scholar, is an honorary resident of the Municipality of Juršinci.

Settlements
In addition to the municipal seat of Juršinci, the municipality also includes the following settlements:

 Bodkovci
 Dragovič
 Gabrnik
 Gradiščak
 Grlinci
 Hlaponci
 Kukava
 Mostje
 Rotman
 Sakušak
 Senčak pri Juršincih
 Zagorci

Notable people
Notable people that were born in the Municipality of Juršinci include:
 Johann Puch (1862–1914), Austrian craftsman and industrialist of Slovene origin, born in Sakušak
 Janža Toplak (1909–1973), farmers' cooperative and rural association organizer, one of the first Liberation Front agitators in the Ptuj area, born in Mostje
 Ludvik Toplak (born 1942), Slovenian lawyer, university rector, ambassador, politician and scholar, born in Mostje
 Jurij Toplak (born 1977), Slovenian legal scholar

References

External links

Municipality of Juršinci on Geopedia
Juršinci municipal site

Juršinci
1994 establishments in Slovenia